Drevsjø is a village in Engerdal municipality in Innlandet county, Norway. The village takes its name from the lake Drevsjø which lies near the village. The Drevsjø Church is located in the village. The village has some commercial businesses serving the municipality such as grocery stores plus a large sawmill.

Drevsjø is well known for its natural environment and its fishing opportunities. It is only 60 minutes from one of Scandinavia's biggest alpine centres, Trysilfjellet. The village has several recreational facilities including a tennis court, football pitch, and a car racing track. The village is the site of the Blokkodden Villmarksmuseum, an open-air museum presenting the history of the use of the natural world since the 18th century.

The village has several municipal and state institutions including nursing homes and health centres. Since 1990, the village has also had a reception centre for asylum seekers in Norway.

Climate
Drevsjø has a subarctic climate (Dfc) with only 3 months with a mean temperature above . There is a wetter period from June to September and a dry period from December to April.

References

Villages in Innlandet
Engerdal